Medardo Luis Luzardo Romero (17 April 1934 – 27 November 2018) was a Venezuelan Roman Catholic archbishop.

Biography 
Luzardo Romero was born in Venezuela and was ordained to the priesthood in 1960. Luzardo Romero served as bishop of the Roman Catholic Diocese of San Carlos de Venezuela from 1972 to 1979. He then served as bishop of the Roman Catholic Diocese of Ciudad Guayana from 1979 to 1986. From 1986 to 2011, Luzardo Romero served as archbishop of the Roman Catholic Archdiocese of Ciudad Bolívar.

Notes

1934 births
2018 deaths
Venezuelan Roman Catholic archbishops
Roman Catholic bishops of San Carlos de Venezuela
Roman Catholic bishops of Ciudad Guayana
Roman Catholic archbishops of Ciudad Bolívar